This list of Ivy League business schools outlines the six universities of the Ivy League that host a business school. The creation of business schools at Ivy League universities occurred over a period of nearly a century, beginning with the Wharton School of the University of Pennsylvania, founded in 1881 by Joseph Wharton, which was the first collegiate (undergraduate) business school in the world. In 1900, the Tuck School at Dartmouth was founded as the world's first graduate school of business; and in 1921, Harvard Business School became the first business school to offer the MBA degree.

Two Ivy League institutions, Brown University and Princeton University, do not have business schools.

Ivy League business schools

Related programs at Ivy League Schools

Cornell's School of Hotel Administration offers BS, MMH, MS, and PhD degrees; and its School of Industrial and Labor Relations offers BS, MILR, EMHRM, and PhD degrees.
Brown's School of Professional Studies offers an EMBA degrees, and it also offers a Business Economics track within its Commerce, Organizations and Entrepreneurship undergraduate concentration. It also jointly offers an EMBA with Spain's Instituto de Empresa Business School.
Princeton is home to the Bendheim Center for Finance, which specializes in quantitative finance and offers an undergraduate finance certificate and the Master in Finance degree.

See also
List of United States graduate business school rankings

References

Business schools in the United States
 
Ivy League